Thomas Fraser  (18 February 1911 – 21 November 1988) was Scottish coal miner and trade unionist, who was a Labour Member of Parliament (MP) for the Hamilton constituency between 1943 and 1967.

Life
He was the son of Thomas and Mary Fraser of Kirkmuirhill, Lanarkshire.
He was educated at Lesmahagow Higher Grade School until the age of 14 when he began work as miner, working underground until his entry to parliament. 

Fraser served as a branch official for his union from 1938 until 1943 and from 1939 until 1943 was  secretary of the Lanark divisional Labour Party. He entered parliament at the 1943 Hamilton by-election, defeating an independent candidate by over 8,000 votes and polling 81.1% of the votes cast. Following the Labour Party's victory in the 1945 general election he was appointed as Joint Under-Secretary of State for Scotland and held the post until his party lost power in 1951 general election.

In opposition Fraser served as Shadow Secretary of State for Scotland "for many years." Following Labour's victory in the 1964 general election he served as Minister of Transport from 16 October 1964 until 23 December 1965. In December 1965 he introduced the 70 mph (113 km/h) speed limit on motorways as an emergency measure following a series of multiple low speed crashes on motorways, mainly in fog. 
Throughout his tenure as Minister, he authorised the closure 1,071 mi of railway lines, following the recommendations from the Beeching Report. However, he went further and authorised the closure of lines, notably the Oxford to Cambridge Line, that even Beeching had not considered closing.

In May 1967 he resigned from Parliament to become chairman of the North of Scotland Hydro-Electric Board. His resignation paved the way for a by-election which resulted in a historic victory for the Scottish National Party's candidate Winnie Ewing.

He was made a Privy Counsellor in 1964. He later served on the Wheatley Commission and was in part responsible for the resulting reforms in Scottish local government. He retired to Lesmahagow, where he had previously been employed as a miner, and died in Law Hospital in 1988 after a brief illness. When he died, one of his successors for the seat, George Robertson, noted there was still "immense respect" for him in Hamilton.

Family
Fraser married in 1935 Janet Scanlon of Lesmahagow. They had a son and a daughter.

Notes

External links 
 

1911 births
1988 deaths
Scottish Labour MPs
Members of the Privy Council of the United Kingdom
Miners' Federation of Great Britain-sponsored MPs
National Union of Mineworkers-sponsored MPs
UK MPs 1935–1945
UK MPs 1945–1950
UK MPs 1950–1951
UK MPs 1951–1955
UK MPs 1955–1959
UK MPs 1959–1964
UK MPs 1964–1966
UK MPs 1966–1970
Secretaries of State for Transport (UK)
Ministers in the Attlee governments, 1945–1951
Ministers in the Wilson governments, 1964–1970